The Pittsburgh Coalfield (Pittsburgh Coal Region) is the largest of the Western Pennsylvania coalfields. It includes all or part of Allegheny, Fayette, Greene, Washington, and Westmoreland  Counties in Pennsylvania. Coal has been mined in Pittsburgh since the 18th century. U.S. Steel and Bethlehem Steel owned Karen, Maple Creek, and Ellsworth mines. It is not possible to define sharp geographical boundaries for this district for none such exist or are reported differently.  The largest company in this field was the Pittsburgh Coal Company, which later became CONSOL Energy. It is bordered on the west by the state of West Virginia, on the south by Panhandle Coalfield and Klondike Coalfield, on the East by Irwin Gas Coalfield, on the North by the Freeport Coalfield and at least one other coalfield.  The Darr Mine Disaster occurred in this coalfield in 1907.

See also
 Pittsburgh coal seam

References

External links
Allegheny County Pennsylvania Coal Mine Index
Washington County Pennsylvania Coal Mine Index
Westmoreland County Pennsylvania Coal Mine Index
Fayette County Pennsylvania Coal Mine Index

Mining in Pennsylvania
Coal mining regions in the United States
Geography of Westmoreland County, Pennsylvania
Geography of Allegheny County, Pennsylvania
Geography of Fayette County, Pennsylvania
Geography of Greene County, Pennsylvania
Geography of Washington County, Pennsylvania